Vasant Vihar is a diplomatic and residential sub-division of the South West Delhi in National Capital Territory of Delhi, India. It is located near the diplomatic area of Chanakyapuri, and houses over 50 diplomatic missions of foreign countries, including the High Commission of South Africa, and embassy of Argentina.

History
It was originally developed in 1960s by retired Government of India officers, later developed as a posh residential locality like Air India And Indian Airlines Colony due to its proximity to diplomatic enclave of Chanakyapuri.

Locality
The four main streets in Vasant Vihar are Munirka Marg, Vasant Marg, Poorvi Marg and Paschimi Marg, literally Eastern and Western Street. These form a rough triangle that encloses much of the neighbourhood. The neighbourhood is primarily residential and when first planned consisted of six blocks named A to F, with each block having its own local market. Vasant Vihar has several parks in every block. Apartments in new emerging luxury buildings in Vasant Vihar have in the past sold at prices ranging from INR 5 Crore to INR 20 Crore (USD 740,000 to USD 3M).

Education
Vasant Vihar also has schools such as Modern School, Delhi Public School (Junior Branch), The Shri Ram School (Junior Wing), Tagore International School, Guru Harkrishan Public School, Holy Child Auxilium School (Senior branch), Chinmaya Vidyalaya, Suraj Bhan DAV Public School, and Sarvodaya School.

Economy
The corporate office of Hero MotoCorp, formerly Hero Honda, is at Basant Lok in Vasant Vihar. In 1996, Vasant Vihar witnessed the opening of India's first McDonald's restaurant, it was also the first McDonald's restaurant in the world to not serve beef and pork based products.

References

Neighbourhoods in Delhi
District subdivisions of Delhi
South West Delhi district